The Bestune B50 (formerly Besturn B50) is a compact sedan produced by the Chinese car manufacturer Bestune from 2009 to 2019. Bestune began to sell its vehicles in the Russian market in 2012 with the B50 as the first model to be sold there, which debuted at the 2012 Moscow International Automobile Salon.

First Generation

The first generation Besturn B50 is a car designed by Italdesign Giugiaro, based on the old Mazda 6 that is still in production at the FAW-Mazda joint venture, and the 1.6-liter engine comes from the Volkswagen Bora made by the FAW-Volkswagen joint venture. It is powered by a naturally aspirated 1.6-liter I4 engine.
In 2013, with 62,342 sales, the B50 was the most popular model in the Besturn range, and in the year 2014, 72,259 units were sold. The transmission is manufactured by Aisin Seiki.

Safety
The B50 received a 4-star crash test rating from C-NCAP.

Second Generation

The second generation Besturn B50 was launched on the Chinese car market in mid-2016. Prices range from 81,800 yuan to 117,800 yuan. The second generation Besturn B50 is also available in an RS sport version. The RS has a black grille with red trim, a tinted roof, an extra spoiler on the trunk lid, RS badges, and a slightly different interior.

References

External links

 Besturn B50 Official site
 FAW Arabia Official site

Besturn vehicles
Sedans
C-NCAP small family cars
Cars of China
Cars introduced in 2009
2010s cars